Euryomyrtus maidenii is a shrub endemic to Western Australia.

It blooms between March and October producing purple-pink flowers.

It is found on sand plains in the Wheatbelt, Mid West and Goldfields-Esperance regions of Western Australia  where it grows in sandy soils over laterite.

References

Eudicots of Western Australia
maidenii
Endemic flora of Western Australia
Plants described in 2001